State Route 112 (SR 112) is a  state highway that travels in a generally southwest-to-northeast orientation in the southwestern and central parts of the U.S. state of Georgia. It passes through portions of Grady, Mitchell, Worth, Turner, Wilcox, Pulaski, Bleckley, Twiggs, Wilkinson, and Baldwin counties, and connects the Cairo and Milledgeville areas of the state.

Route description

SR 112 begins at an intersection with US 84/SR 38 (Bill Stanfill Highway) in the northern part of Cairo, in Grady County. It heads northwest and curves to the north, until it intersects SR 262 (County Line Road) on the Grady–Mitchell county line. The road curves to the northeast to an intersection with SR 65. The road continues to the northeast, passing the Camilla–Mitchell County Airport, just before entering Camilla. In town, it meets SR 97 (Bainbridge Road), and the two highways run concurrent farther into town. At South Butler Street, SR 97 splits off to the northwest, while SR 37 Truck begins concurrent with SR 112. The concurrent routes meet SR 37 (Newton Road). At West Oakland Avenue they turn to the east. At the intersection with US 19/SR 3/SR 300 (Georgia–Florida Parkway), SR 37 Truck turns to the south, while SR 112 continues to the east. The highway heads northeast and has an extremely brief concurrency with SR 93 in Lester. Shortly afterward, SR 112 crosses into Worth County. A little while after crossing into the county is SR 133. The route continues to the northeast, until it enters Sylvester. In town, it intersects US 82/SR 520 (Franklin Street). At the intersection with SR 33, SR 112 turns to the north with SR 33 for just under . SR 112 splits off to the northeast and passes through rural areas until it crosses into Turner County. In Ashburn, it meets SR 32. The two routes run concurrent into the main part of town. There, they intersect US 41/SR 7. At this intersection, SR 32 departs to the south-southeast, while SR 112 continues to the east-northeast. It continues along it routing until it reaches an interchange with Interstate 75 (I-75), just before leaving town. At the east end of the interchange, SR 107 begins concurrent with SR 112. Just over  later, SR 107 departs to the northeast into Rebecca. In Rebecca, it meets SR 90 (Ashley Street East). SR 90 splits off to the northwest along North Railroad Street, while SR 112 heads northeast, and then northward, on Sylvester Road. A few miles to the north, the road enters Wilcox County. After the county line, it continue to the north and curves to the northeast. Just before entering Rochelle, it intersects SR 233. The two routes begin a concurrency through town. In the southern part of town, SR 215 (5th Avenue) joins the concurrency. A few blocks later, the concurrent routes meet US 280/SR 30 (1st Avenue). At this intersection, SR 215 departs to the west, while SR 112/SR 233 continue to the north. North of town, the two routes split, with SR 112 heading northwest. It travels through Pineview and into Pulaski County. The road heads northwest and curves to the northeast to an intersection with US 129/SR 11. The concurrent routes head northward into Hawkinsville. In town, they meet SR 27/SR 230/SR 257 (Broad Street). At this intersection, US 129/SR 11 head west, while US 129 Business/SR 11 Business head north and US 129 Alternate joins the concurrency. East of town, US 129 Alternate/SR 112/SR 257 head north, while SR 230 heads south and SR 27 head to the east. Almost immediately is an intersection with US 341/SR 26. Here, SR 26 joins the concurrency, while SR 27 departs to the east, running concurrent with US 341. US 129 Alternate/SR 26/SR 112/SR 257 head northeast for a short distance, until SR 257 leaves the concurrency to the northeast. US 129 Alternate/SR 26/SR 112 head to the northeast and enter Bleckley County. In Cochran, the three highways meet US 23 Business/SR 87 Business (South 2nd Street). At this intersection, SR 26 continues to the northeast on East Dykes Street, while US 23 Business/US 129 Alternate/SR 87 Business/SR 112 head northwest and then curve to the northeast to an intersection with US 23/SR 87. At this intersection, US 23 Business/SR 87 Business end. US 23/US 129 Alternate/SR 87/SR 112 head northwest, until SR 112 splits off to the northeast. It has an interchange with I-16. Almost immediately, the road crosses the extreme southeastern corner of Twiggs County and enters Allentown. The Twiggs–Wilkinson county line runs through the town's limits Farther into town is US 80/SR 19. The highway passes through rural areas of the county to an intersection with US 441/SR 29 in Nicklesville. The road curves to the north, to meet SR 57 (Irwinton Road) in Toomsboro. Then, it curves to the northwest, to enter Baldwin County. SR 112 continues to the northwest and meets its northern terminus at an intersection with SR 540.

There are two sections of SR 112 that are part of the National Highway System, a system of roadways important to the nation's economy, defense, and mobility.
 The section concurrent with SR 32 in Ashburn
 The section concurrent with US 129 Alternate between Hawkinsville and Cochran

History
Before the Fall Line Freeway (SR 540) was built, SR 112 continued north to Milledgeville and had its northern terminus at an intersection of SR 22/SR 24 and the northern terminus of SR 49 (North Elbert Street / East Hancock Street). After the Fall Line Freeway (SR 540) was built and open to traffic in 2018, SR 112 was truncated and had its new northern terminus at an intersection of SR 540 (Fall Line Freeway).

Major intersections

Milledgeville spur route

State Route 112 Spur (SR 112 Spur) was a spur route of SR 112 that existed entirely within the east-central part of Milledgeville. It was known as Vinson Highway for its entire length.

It began at an intersection with the SR 112 mainline. It curved to the left and met its northern terminus, an intersection with US 441 Bus./SR 243 (South Wayne Street).

The roadway that would eventually become SR 112 Spur was established between January 1945 and November 1946, as SR 29 Spur on the northern part of Vinson Highway, from the southern part of Vinson Highway in the southeastern part of the city north-northwest and northwest to US 441/SR 29 (Wayne Street) in the southern part of the city. Between July 1957 and June 1960, it was redesignated as SR 112 Spur. The southern part of Vinson Highway was designated as part of SR 112. In 1989, this highway was decommissioned.

See also

References

External links

 
 Georgia Roads (Routes 101-120)

112
Transportation in Grady County, Georgia
Transportation in Mitchell County, Georgia
Transportation in Worth County, Georgia
Transportation in Turner County, Georgia
Transportation in Wilcox County, Georgia
Transportation in Pulaski County, Georgia
Transportation in Bleckley County, Georgia
Transportation in Twiggs County, Georgia
Transportation in Wilkinson County, Georgia
Transportation in Baldwin County, Georgia
Milledgeville micropolitan area, Georgia